Rajya Sabha elections were held on various dates in 2001, to elect members of the Rajya Sabha, Indian Parliament's upper chamber. 2 members from Assam  and 6 members from Tamil Nadu  were elected to Rajya Sabha.

Elections
Elections were held to elect members from various states.

Members elected
The following members are elected in the elections held in 2001. They are members for the term 2001-2007 and retire in year 2007, except in case of the resignation or death before the term.
The list is incomplete.

State - Member - Party

Bye-elections
The following bye elections were held in the year 2001.

State - Member - Party

 Bye-elections were held on 22/02/2001 for vacancy from Punjab and Uttar Pradesh  due to disqualification of seating member Barjinder Singh Hamdard on 21.12.2000 with term ending on 09.04.2004 and death of seating member Chaudhary Chuni Lal on 31.12.2000  with term ending on 25.11.2002. From UP Shyam Lal of BJP became member from 16/02/2001.
 Haryana - xx  - INLD ( ele 04/06/2001 term till 2004 )- dea of Devi Lal
 Punjab - xx - SAD ( ele 04/06/2001 term till 2004 )- res of Raj Mohinder Singh Majitha
 Uttar Pradesh - Kalraj Mishra - BJP ( ele 04/06/2001 term till 2006 )- res of Raj Nath Singh 
 Jharkhand - Dayanand Sahay - IND ( ele 19/07/2001 term till 2004 ) dea 19/03/2002
 Bye-elections were held on 17/01/2002 for vacancy from Tamil Nadu  due to death of seating member G. K. Moopanar on 30 August 2001  with term ending on 29 June 2004

References

2001 elections in India
2001